Ghiselin is a surname. Notable people with the surname include: 

Brewster Ghiselin (1903–2002), American poet and academic
Johannes Ghiselin (fl. 1491–1507), Flemish composer
Michael Ghiselin (born 1939), American biologist, philosopher, and historian of biology
Ogier Ghiselin de Busbecq (1522–1592), Flemish writer, herbalist and diplomat